The Wish List is the fifth and final of five EPs by recording artist Tinchy Stryder. It was released on 24 December 2011 by Takeover Entertainment as a free downloadable EP prior to the release of Stryder's cancelled fourth solo studio album, Full Tank.

The EP's cover art is a graphic image of Stryder with, computer-generated imagery as a background of the broken portrait standing on top of a building. The image was made during the Full Tank promo shoot.

The song "Oh No" was the B-side of Stryder's 2011 UK Singles Chart top-five hit "Spaceship" and the song "Generation" was the B-side of Stryder's 2011 single "Off the Record" featuring Calvin Harris.

Track listing

References

External links
 Tinchy Stryder - The Wish List EP. SoundCloud.

2010 EPs
Tinchy Stryder albums
Takeover Entertainment EPs